Ivanhoe was a small settlement located in the Trinity area of Newfoundland and Labrador. The post office in Ivanhoe was finished being built on September 4, 1952, and opened to the public for business on September 11 of that year.  The first postmistress was Mrs. Lillian Ivany, in honour of whom the post office itself was named. Soon after establishment though, the community was depopulated on September 13, 1966.

See also
 List of communities in Newfoundland and Labrador

Ghost towns in Newfoundland and Labrador